The 2013 West Virginia Mountaineers football team represented West Virginia University in the 2013 NCAA Division I FBS football season. Playing as a member of the Big 12 Conference (Big 12), the team was led by head coach Dana Holgorsen, in his third year. West Virginia played its home games on Mountaineer Field at Milan Puskar Stadium in Morgantown, West Virginia.  The team finished the season at 4-8 (2-7 in Big 12 play), and as a result, they failed to qualify for a bowl game for the first time since going 3-8 in 2001.

Schedule

Schedule sources:

Game summaries

William & Mary

#16 Oklahoma

Georgia State

Maryland

#11 Oklahoma State

#17 Baylor

#16 Texas Tech

Kansas State

TCU

Texas

Kansas

Iowa State

Coaching staff

References

West Virginia
West Virginia Mountaineers football seasons
West Virginia Mountaineers football